Rauha Olivia Elisabet Rentola (4 February 1919, Kuhmoinen − 20 July 2005) was a Finnish actress. During her career, she appeared in close to a hundred films while also working for Finnish National Theatre for half a century.

Selected filmography

 Light Melody (1946)
 Tree Without Fruit (1947)
 Suopursu kukkii (1947)
 Prinsessa Ruusunen (1949)
 Radio tulee hulluksi (1952)
 April's Coming (1953)
 Silja – nuorena nukkunut (1956)
 Tulipunainen kyyhkynen (1961)
 Kaasua, komisario Palmu! (1962)

References

External links 
 

1919 births
2005 deaths
People from Kuhmoinen
Finnish film actresses